Hwang Eul-su was a Korean boxer. He competed in the men's lightweight event at the 1932 Summer Olympics representing Japan using the name Otsu Shuko, misspelling of Otsushu Ko, an alternative pronunciation of Otsuhide Ō, the Japanese pronunciation of his Hanja name 黃乙秀.

References

External links
 

Year of birth missing
Korean male boxers
Japanese male boxers
Olympic boxers of Japan
Boxers at the 1932 Summer Olympics
People from Cheorwon County
Lightweight boxers